The 2011–12 Bangladesh Women's Football League, also known as the Walton Dhaka Metropolis Women's Football League 2011 due to sponsorship reason, it was the 1st season of domestic women's club football competition in Bangladesh hosted and organized by Bangladesh Football Federation (BFF). The totall 8 teams were participated in the tournament.

Sheikh Jamal Dhanmondi Club Women are current champions. The club have defeated Dhaka Mohammedan Women by 2–0 on 14 October  2011 to lift the trophy for the first time.

Venue

Participating teams
The following eight teams were contested in the tournament.

Group summary

Round and dates

Group stages

Knockout stage

Winners

Statistics

References

Women's football in Bangladesh
Bangladesh Women's Football League seasons
2011 in Bangladeshi football
2011–12 in Asian association football leagues
2011–12 domestic women's association football leagues